Wola Kalinowska  is a village in the administrative district of Gmina Sułoszowa, within Kraków County, Lesser Poland Voivodeship, in southern Poland.

References

Wola Kalinowska